John Paulu (1850–1930) was a member of the Wisconsin State Assembly.

Biography
Paulu was born in Bohemia in 1850. When he was sixteen he learned the architect and building trades. He settled in Milwaukee, Wisconsin in 1871 before moving to Lake, Milwaukee County, Wisconsin in 1889. He got married in 1887 and had six kids.

Career
Paulu was elected to the Assembly in 1912, defeating incumbent Frank Metcalfe. Metcalfe would later accuse him of corruption during the campaign. Additionally, Paulu was Chairman of Supervisors of Lake, a member of the Milwaukee County, Wisconsin Board, and a justice of the peace for eleven years.

References

1850 births
1930 deaths
Bohemian people
Politicians from Milwaukee
Mayors of places in Wisconsin
County supervisors in Wisconsin
Democratic Party members of the Wisconsin State Assembly
American justices of the peace
Austro-Hungarian emigrants to the United States